Streptomyces atacamensis is a bacterium species from the genus Streptomyces which has been isolated from soil from the Atacama Desert in Valle de la Luna in Chile.

See also 
 List of Streptomyces species

References

Further reading

External links
Type strain of Streptomyces atacamensis at BacDive -  the Bacterial Diversity Metadatabase

atacamensis
Bacteria described in 2012